Tauno Söder (13 January 1927 – 2 May 2009) was a Finnish actor. He appeared in 99 films and television shows between 1954 and 1979. He starred in the film Yksityisalue, which was entered into the 13th Berlin International Film Festival.

Selected filmography
 The Scarlet Dove (1961)
 Yksityisalue (1962)

References

External links

1927 births
2009 deaths
Finnish male film actors